G.I. Joe: Spy Troops is a 2003 American computer-animated military science fiction action film produced by Reel FX Creative Studios and distributed by Paramount Home Entertainment.

The film was released direct-to-video and premiered on Cartoon Network on September 27, 2003. A sequel, titled G.I. Joe: Valor vs. Venom, was released on September 14, 2004.

History
When Hasbro launched G.I. Joe vs. Cobra in 2002, an updated revival of the G.I. Joe: A Real American Hero toyline that was sold between 1982 and 1994, they commissioned Reel FX Creative Studios to produce a series of CGI-animated commercials to promote the new line of figures. They would follow this up with an hour-long direct-to-video movie titled Spy Troops to promote the 2003 series of figures released under the sub-line of the same name. Spy Troops was written by Larry Hama, who wrote the original filecards and the Marvel comic series.

Plot
The plot revolves around G.I. Joe, America's "daring, highly trained special missions force". The Joes have just perfected a new technology: Mind Interface Remote Control (MIRC), which allows soldiers to flawlessly command vehicles from a safe distance. The title refers to the fact that the two opposing forces, the G.I. Joe Team and Cobra, make use of spies to achieve their objectives. Cobra sends Zartan, to infiltrate G.I. Joe headquarters posing as Shipwreck, and steal the MIRC technology. The Joes send Shipwreck and Snake Eyes to the enemy's camp, after learning about what happened. The Joes then organize an assault on Cobra Mountain and successfully regain the technology, destroying Cobra's base and chopper in the process.

Cast

Release
Spy Troops: The Movie was released on DVD in September 2003, with the 12" Ninja Showdown two-pack. It had a suggested retail price of $19.95. Later, it was also available alone, with a suggested retail price of $4.95. Cartoon Network premiered Spy Troops: The Movie on September 27, 2003 at 10:00 p.m.

References

External links
 Reel FX Creative Studios home page
 
 

2003 direct-to-video films
2003 computer-animated films
G.I. Joe (franchise) animated films
Direct-to-video animated films
Reel FX Creative Studios films
2000s American animated films
Paramount Pictures animated films
Paramount Pictures direct-to-video films
Toonami
2000s English-language films